Tenaturris merita is a species of sea snail, a marine gastropod mollusk in the family Mangeliidae.

Description
The length of the shell varies between 7 mm and 12 mm.

The acuminate ovate-turreted shell contains 6 smooth whorls. It is shortly plicately ribbed, transversely striated, angulated next the simple suture. The outer lip is sharp. The aperture is oblong. The siphonal canal is almost non-existent. Its color is yellowish, the back of body whorl is clouded with brown, with a brown line on the shoulder-angle.

Distribution
This species occurs in the Pacific Ocean, between Monterey, California and Costa Rica

References

External links
  Dall, William Healey. Summary of the marine shellbearing mollusks of the northwest coast of America: from San Diego, California, to the Polar Sea, mostly contained in the collection of the United States National Museum, with illustrations of hitherto unfigured species. No. 112. Govt. print. off., 1921  
 
 

merita
Gastropods described in 1843